South Otter Township (T11N R7W) is located in Macoupin County, Illinois, United States. As of the 2010 census, its population was 465 and it contained 204 housing units.

Geography

Demographics

Adjacent townships
 North Otter Township (north)
 Girard Township (northeast)
 Nilwood Township (east)
 Shaws Point Township (southeast)
 Carlinville Township (south)
 Bird Township (southwest)
 South Palmyra Township (west)
 North Palmyra Township (northwest)

References

External links
US Census
City-data.com
Illinois State Archives

Townships in Macoupin County, Illinois
Townships in Illinois